The Sudoku Cube or Sudokube is a variation on a Rubik's Cube in which the faces have numbers one to nine on the sides instead of colours. The aim is to solve Sudoku puzzles on one or more of the sides. The toy was created in 2006 by Jay Horowitz in Sebring, Ohio.

Production
The Sudoku Cube was invented by veteran toy maker Jay Horowitz after he had the idea to combine Sudoku and a Rubik's Cube. Horowitz already owned molds to produce Rubik's Cubes and was able to use them to produce his new design. Mass production is completed in China by American Classic Toy Inc, a company belonging to Horowitz. The product is sold in the United States in retailers such as Barnes & Noble and FAO Schwarz. There are 12 types of Sudoku Cube, which differ in difficulty and are aimed at different age ranges.

Description
In a standard Rubik's Cube, the player must match up colours on each side of the cube. In the Sudoku Cube, the player must place the numbers one to nine on each side with no repetition. This is achieved by rotating the sides of the cube. Variations of the Sudoku Cube are the Sudokube and Roxdoku, as well as cubes with 4×4×4 squares instead of the normal 3×3×3. This cube is very difficult compared to other cubes because as well as requiring basic knowledge of a Rubik's cube, the player must also know basic sudoku concepts. Any wrong move could put the puzzle in jeopardy.

Computer simulations
3-D programming languages such as VPython can be used to create simulations of a Sudoku Cube. Such simulations can offer features such as scaling the sudokube (to create 4×4×4 or 5×5×5 puzzles), saving, resetting, undoing, and the option to design one's own sudokube patterns.

References

See also
Combination puzzles
Mechanical puzzles

Rubik's Cube
Sudoku